The National University of Natural Medicine (NUNM) is a private university of naturopathic medicine and Classical Chinese medicine located in Portland, Oregon.  The school has approximately 553 students.

History

The National University of Natural Medicine is the oldest programmatically accredited naturopathic medical school in North America. NUNM began in the early 1950s, in response to the termination of the naturopathic program at Western States Chiropractic College. Members of the profession from Oregon, Washington and British Columbia planned the founding of the school and in May 1956, Charles Stone, W. Martin Bleything and Frank Spaulding executed the Articles of Incorporation of the National College of Naturopathic Medicine in Portland, Oregon.

NCNM opened other satellite campus locations in Seattle and Kansas. NCNM's board of trustees and college administration (including John Bastyr, Joe Boucher, Robert Fleming, Gerald Farnsworth, Joe Pizzorno and Bruce Canvasser) decided to unify all of its campus locations in Portland. The first physical location owned by the college was the Market Street campus in southeast Portland.

By 1995, the college began negotiations to purchase its current location in downtown Portland. Classes were relocated to this campus in September 1996 and clinical education was housed in two clinics (Natural Health Center and the Pettygrove Clinic). The historic building that has served as NCNM's main campus since 1996 was built in 1912 as an elementary school named  School (in honor of former mayor Josiah Failing) and from 1961 until the 1990s was a Portland Community College campus. In 2009, these clinics were consolidated into one location on campus, the NCNM Clinic.

In July 2006, NCNM changed its name to the National College of Natural Medicine. In June 2016, the school changed its name to the National University of Natural Medicine.

Academics

NUNM has four colleges/schools: College of Naturopathic Medicine, College of Classical Chinese Medicine, School of Graduate Studies, and School of Undergraduate and Part-Time Studies. It offers eight professional graduate degree programs: Doctor of Naturopathic Medicine (ND), Doctor of Science in Oriental Medicine (DSOM), Master of Science in Integrative Medicine Research (MSiMR), Master of Science in Oriental Medicine (MSOM), Master of Science in Nutrition, Master of Science in Global Health, Master of Science in Ayurveda, and Master of Science in Integrative Mental Health. Undergraduate programs include nutrition, integrative health sciences, and integrative therapeutics. These programs include preparation and clinical practice in holism.

The School of Graduate Studies offers a two-year Master of Science in Integrative Medicine Research (MSiMR), a program for students interested in complementary and alternative medicine. The Master of Science in Oriental Medicine (MSOM) program is a four-year program in the classical foundations of Chinese medicine. Students receive training in herbalism, acupuncture, moxibustion, Asian bodywork, qigong and nutrition. The Master of Acupuncture (MAc) is a three-year program focusing on classical acupuncture and moxibustion, and providing a shorter course of study, with less theory and herbal instruction.

NUNM is a member of the American Association of Naturopathic Medical Colleges and is accredited by the Northwest Commission on Colleges and Universities, the Council on Naturopathic Medical Education and the Accreditation Commission for Acupuncture and Oriental Medicine.

The Princeton Review reports that naturopathic medicine program had an acceptance rate of 82% with an average undergraduate GPA of 3.38.

NUNM Clinic

The NUNM Health Center is a teaching clinic where licensed naturopathic doctors and acupuncturists work with and train students. It is owned and managed by the university. The health center features a medicinary, private offices, conference rooms and a state-licensed laboratory.

The university also has several community clinics, in conjunction with other agencies and as a member of the Coalition of Community Clinics, which offers low-cost naturopathic care and acupuncture in the Portland metropolitan area. In 2013, the NUNM Community Clinics provided services to more than 40,000 patients.

Campus

NUNM's main building was constructed in 1912 as an elementary school in the Portland Public Schools system, named  School, for former mayor Josiah Failing. It was a replacement for an 1883-built wooden school building with that name, located about two blocks away, which was torn down in 1922. The NUNM building was designed by Whitehouse & Fouilhoux, the architectural firm of Morris H. Whitehouse and Jacques Fouilhoux. A distinctive feature is the sundial, instead of a traditional clock, adorning the south façade near the roof.

 School closed in spring 1959, and the building was used by Portland public schools for a vocational training program for graduates beginning in fall 1959. In 1961, this program was renamed Portland Community College and the building was renamed the Adult Education Center. The building was extensively renovated in 1964 for expansion of PCC's vocational programs. In 1971, the building was sold to Portland Community College, and it was later renamed the Ross Island Center.

In June 1996, Bill Naito's company, H. Naito Corporation, purchased the building, with tentative plans to convert it into condominiums. Bill Naito said that part of his motivation was to save the historic structure. Naito died suddenly in May 1996, and the plans to convert the building were dropped. A few months later, in September 1996, the Naito Corp. sold the building to the National College of Naturopathic Medicine.

Criticism

Research conducted at NCNM has been called a misuse of research funds, as 2.4 million dollars from 2005 to 2012 were granted by the National Center for Complementary and Integrative Health (NCCIH) and used to support unproven therapies.

The naturopathic curriculum has been criticized for teaching pseudoscience and quackery, as courses in homeopathy, herbalism, acupuncture, and other alternative treatments without a solid evidence basis are taught as "primary care medicine".

References

External links 

 Official website

1956 establishments in Oregon
Chinese-American culture in Portland, Oregon
Educational institutions established in 1956
Healthcare in Portland, Oregon
Naturopathic medical schools accredited by the Council on Naturopathic Medical Education
Sundials
Universities and colleges accredited by the Northwest Commission on Colleges and Universities
Universities and colleges in Portland, Oregon
South Portland, Portland, Oregon
Alternative medicine organizations
Private universities and colleges in Oregon